Great Egg Coast Guard Station, is located in Longport, Atlantic County, New Jersey, United States. The station was built in 1939 and added to the National Register of Historic Places on October 31, 2005.

See also
National Register of Historic Places listings in Atlantic County, New Jersey

External Links 
Longport Historical Society

References

Colonial Revival architecture in New Jersey
Government buildings completed in 1939
Longport, New Jersey
National Register of Historic Places in Atlantic County, New Jersey
New Jersey Register of Historic Places
1939 establishments in New Jersey
United States Coast Guard stations
Military facilities on the National Register of Historic Places in New Jersey